Meera Mohideen Mohamed Musthaffa is a Sri Lankan politician, a former member of the Parliament of Sri Lanka and a former government minister.

Musthaffa stood as an independent candidate in the 2010 presidential election and came 17th out of 22 candidates after receiving 3,134 votes (0.03%).

References

Year of birth missing (living people)
Living people
Candidates in the 2010 Sri Lankan presidential election
Members of the 12th Parliament of Sri Lanka
Members of the 13th Parliament of Sri Lanka
Government ministers of Sri Lanka
United National Party politicians
United People's Freedom Alliance politicians
Sri Lankan Muslims